The 1980 All-Ireland Under-21 Hurling Championship was the 17th staging of the All-Ireland Under-21 Hurling Championship since its establishment by the Gaelic Athletic Association in 1964.

Tipperary were the defending champions.

On 14 September 1980, Tipperary won the championship following a 2-9 to 0-14 defeat of Kilkenny in the All-Ireland final. This was their fourth All-Ireland title in the under-21 grade and their second in succession.

Results

Leinster Under-21 Hurling Championship

Final

Munster Under-21 Hurling Championship

First round

Semi-finals

Final

All-Ireland Under-21 Hurling Championship

Semi-finals

Final

References

Under
All-Ireland Under-21 Hurling Championship